Rhyzodiastes orestes is a species of ground beetle in the subfamily Rhysodinae. It was described by R.T. Bell and J.R. Bell in 2009. It is endemic to Tibet.

Rhyzodiastes orestes measures  in length.

References

Rhyzodiastes
Beetles of Asia
Insects of China
Endemic fauna of Tibet
Beetles described in 2009